"Titanium Mike Saves the Day " is a science fiction short story published in 2007 by David D. Levine.  It was nominated for the 2008 Nebula Award for Best Short Story.

Plot summary
The story is composed of several small episodes set in our solar system.  In each one someone tells about an adventure of Titanium Mike (a man whose exploits in the solar system range from incredible to unbelievable) to help solve their current problem.

Footnotes

Science fiction short stories
2007 short stories